Upper Ninety is a single by instrumental rock band Russian Circles, released on Suicide Squeeze Records.  The single was limited to only 2,000 copies. "Upper Ninety" is also featured on Suicide Squeeze's compilation album Slaying Since 1996.

Track listing

References

Suicide Squeeze Records singles
Russian Circles songs
2006 singles
2006 songs